"We Can Do It!" is a World War II inspirational artwork by J. Howard Miller.

We Can Do It may also refer to:

 We Can Do It (album), by the Rubettes, 1975
 "We Can Do It" (Carboo song), 2000
 "We Can Do It" (Liverpool F.C. song), 1977
 "We Can Do It" (September song), 2003
 "Kaya Natin Ito!" or "We Can Do It!", a charity single to benefit Philippine typhoon victims, 2009
 "We Can Do It", a song by Jamiroquai from Automaton, 2017
 "We Can Do It", a song from the musical The Producers, 2001

See also
 Yes We Can (disambiguation)